Olesk is an Estonian surname. Notable people with the surname include:

Gert Olesk (born 1973), football player
Lui Olesk (1876–1932), politician and lawyer
Olev Olesk (1921–2017), exile politician

Estonian-language surnames